Deodoro Stadium is a temporary stadium at Deodoro Modern Pentathlon Park in Rio de Janeiro, Brazil. The stadium hosted rugby sevens and modern pentathlon events during the 2016 Summer Olympics. The stadium served as the venue for the seven-a-side football at the 2016 Summer Paralympics.

The Deodoro Modern Pentathlon Park hosts all five competitions within walking distance:

The Deodoro Pentathlon Park is a part of the greater Deodoro Olympic venues cluster which also hosts the Olympic Whitewater Canoe/Kayak slalom, Field Hockey, Mountain Bike and BMX cycling competitions. The Mountain Bike, BMX and Whitewater venues are grouped together in the Deodoro Extreme Park (or X Park).

References

External links 
Olympic Games - Facilities - Deodoro Region (brasil2016.gov.br)
Rio de Janeiro Olympic venues map (rio2016.com)
Venues of the 2016 Summer Olympics on Google Maps

Sports venues in Rio de Janeiro (city)
Venues of the 2016 Summer Olympics
Olympic modern pentathlon venues
Deodoro Olympic Park
Olympic rugby venues
Rugby union stadiums in Brazil